Wunsiedel Marble is a group of metamorphic carbonate rocks, which were, and are, mainly extracted in the German town Wunsiedel at several quarries. This Upper Franconian calcite marble occurs both in this region and beyond, particularly in Bavaria. It is found in a northern band (around Wunsiedel) and southern band (at Marktredwitz and Arzberg).

Examples of use 

Wunsiedel
 Cemetery, grave slabs
 Town hall, flooring
 Courtyard design of the primary and secondary school (extension)

Fuchsmühl
 Mariahilf pilgrimage church, flooring

See also
List of types of marble

Sources 
 F. Eder / U. Emmert / G. v. Horstig / G. Stettner: Geologische Übersichtskarte 1:200.000, CC 6334 Bayreuth. Hannover (Bundesanstalt für Geowissenschaften und Rohstoffe) 1981
 C. Gäbert / A. Steuer / Karl Weiss: Die nutzbaren Gesteinsvorkommen Deutschlands. Berlin (Union Dt. Verlagsgesellschaft) 1915
 Dietmar Herrmann: Vom Bergbau im Fichtelgebirge (Teil 2). Beiträge zur Geschichts- und Landeskunde des Fichtelgebirges 12 (1990), Wunsiedel (Buchhandlung Kohler) 1990
 Arndt / Henrich / Laubmann et al.: Die nutzbaren Mineralien, Gesteine und Erden Bayerns. I. Bd. Frankenwald, Fichtelgebirge und Bayerischer Wald. München (Oldenbourg und Piloty&Loehle) 1924
 Friedrich Müller: Bayerns steinreiche Ecke. Hof (Ackermann Verlag) 1990  
 Otto M. Reis:Die Gesteine der Münchner Bauten und Denkmäler. Veröffentlichungen der Gesellschaft für Bayerische Landeskunde, e.V. München. München 1935

References

See also
List of types of marble

Marble
Quarries in Germany
Wunsiedel
Fichtel Mountains